Victor Wong Pin Kuan (Pha̍k-fa-sṳ: Vòng Phín-kwon) is a Malaysian Chinese singer who has made his name in the Taiwan music scene. He was born on 26 February 1972.

Discography
 2000 – 自创品牌
 2001 – 疼你的责任
 2002 – 教堂的初吻
 2003 – u-turn 180•转弯
 2004 – 门没锁
 2005 – 后来的我新歌＋精选
 2006 – 爱到无可救药
 2007 – Need U Most 最需语你 – K歌情人
 2008 – 那些女孩教我的事
 2009 – 一切为了爱 新歌加精选
 2010 – 當品冠遇見幾米 我想記得的47件事
 2011 – 未拆的禮物(A Gift of Love)
 2014 – 隨時都在
 2015 – 無法理解的大人
 2018 – 靈魂伴侶 (粵語: ling4 wan4 bun6 leoi5), 另一種開始 (國語)

Filmography
 Ice Kacang Puppy Love (2010)
 Jie Mei (2011)
 Rhythm of the Rain (2013)
 Death Trip (2015)

References

External links
 TheStar
 Victor Wong Album Lyrics

1972 births
Living people
Malaysian people of Hakka descent
Malaysian expatriates in Taiwan
People from Jiexi
Malaysian Mandopop singers
People from Kuala Lumpur
People from Jieyang
Hakka musicians